Laurent d'Arvieux (21 June 1635 – 30 October 1702) was a French traveller and diplomat born in Marseille.

Arvieux is known for his travels in the Middle East, which began in 1654 as a merchant in the Ottoman port of Smyrna. From 1658 he travelled throughout the Levant (Lebanon, Syria and Palestine) and in 1666 visited Tunis. Later he returned to France, and in 1674–75 was assigned as consul to Algiers, then later served as consul to Aleppo from 1679 to 1686.

During Arvieux's travels he was witness to 17th-century Arab and Turkish societies, and gained important insight involving all facets of their culture and customs. He also familiarized himself with the languages of the region, and learned to speak Arabic, Turkish, Persian, Hebrew and Syriac languages. Because of his knowledge of Turkish manners and dress he collaborated with Molière on the development of Le Bourgeois gentilhomme.  

At the time of Arvieux's death, he left behind a manuscript of his memoirs, a portion of which was edited by Jean de la Roque (1661–1745) and published in 1717 as Voyage dans la Palestine. Later Arvieux's memoirs were edited and published in their entirety by Jean-Baptiste Labat (1663–1738) as Mémoires du chevalier d'Arvieux (6 volumes, 1735). An English account of his travels was published in 1962 by Warren Lewis, entitled Levantine Adventurer: The Travels and Missions of the Chevalier d'Arvieux 1653-1697.

References 
 Exiles and Migrants by Anthony Coulson
 Parts of this article are based on a translation of an equivalent article at the French Wikipedia.

External links 
Laurent d'Arvieux at Bibliothèque nationale de France
Voyage dans la Palestine at Bibliothèque nationale de France
Voyage dans la Palestine at Internet Archive
The travels of the chevalier d'Arvieux in Arabia the desart (translation of Voyage dans la Palestine) at HathiTrust

1635 births
1702 deaths
French explorers
Diplomats from Marseille